Jack Crowe (born May 2, 1947) is a former American football coach. He played quarterback at West End High School in Birmingham, Alabama. He was most recently the head coach at Jacksonville State University in Alabama, a position he held from 2000 to 2012.  Crowe served as the head football coach at the University of Arkansas from 1990 to 1992 season. Crowe was also the head coach at Livingston University, now known as the University of West Alabama, from 1977 to 1978. He served as offensive coordinator for head coach Pat Dye at both Wyoming and Auburn. In addition, Crowe has served as an assistant coach at the University of North Alabama, Clemson University, and Baylor University. He is married to Leann Crowe.

Coaching career
Crowe first came to Arkansas in 1989 as offensive coordinator under Ken Hatfield. When Hatfield left to become head coach at Clemson a month after the season ended, athletic director Frank Broyles was in a desperate situation. Not only was there nowhere near enough time to find a big-name replacement, but National Signing Day was just three weeks away. Broyles persuaded Crowe to drop his initial plans to follow Hatfield to Clemson and take over as head coach of the Razorbacks.  By the start of the season, the Razorbacks had seen Barry Foster give up his senior season to enter the 1990 NFL Draft and had lost numerous other players to disciplinary and academic problems. Under the circumstances, the Razorbacks struggled to a 3-8 record. They barely qualified for a bowl in 1991.

The Razorbacks opened the 1992 season—their first in the Southeastern Conference—with an upset loss to a Division I-AA team, The Citadel.  The next day, Broyles announced that Crowe had resigned and that defensive coordinator Joe Kines would coach the Razorbacks for the rest of the season.  However, Crowe's lawyer subsequently told Sports Illustrated that Crowe had been fired, and Broyles admitted that he'd fired Crowe due to concern that the fans no longer had confidence in him.  He finished 9-15 in two seasons and one game in Fayetteville.

At Jacksonville State, Crowe won two official conference titles.  He would have won a third in 2009. However, JSU was ineligible for the conference title and postseason play after being placed on Academic Progress Rate probation because of the team's poor academic performance. He also coached Ashley Martin, the first woman to play and score in an NCAA football game and the second woman to play and score in a college game in any division.

Crowe's 2010 Jacksonville State team pulled a major upset to start the season, beating Houston Nutt's Ole Miss Rebels at Vaught–Hemingway Stadium, 49–48 in double overtime. Nutt was an assistant under Crowe when Crowe was fired from Arkansas. On November 30, 2012, Crowe was fired by Jacksonville State.

Head coaching record

*Fired after 1 game

See also
 2001 Cumberland vs. Jacksonville State football game

References

1947 births
Living people
Arkansas Razorbacks football coaches
Auburn Tigers football coaches
Baylor Bears football coaches
Clemson Tigers football coaches
Jacksonville State Gamecocks football coaches
North Alabama Lions football coaches
West Alabama Tigers football coaches
Wyoming Cowboys football coaches
University of Alabama at Birmingham alumni
University of West Alabama alumni
Sportspeople from Birmingham, Alabama